Little Beside House is a Grade II listed country house in the civil parish of Gwennap, Cornwall, England, UK. It was built in the early 19th century and extended in the early-mid 19th century.

References

Houses in Cornwall
Grade II listed buildings in Cornwall